Alexis Sebastian Chavez (born 18 July 2002) is an Argentine Paralympic athlete specializing in sprints. He represented Argentina at the 2020 Summer Paralympics.

Career
Chavez represented Argentina at the 2020 Summer Paralympics in the 100 metres T36 event and won a bronze medal.

References 

2002 births
Living people
People from Pergamino
Paralympic athletes of Argentina
Medalists at the 2019 Parapan American Games
Athletes (track and field) at the 2020 Summer Paralympics
Medalists at the 2020 Summer Paralympics
Paralympic bronze medalists for Argentina
Paralympic medalists in athletics (track and field)
Argentine male sprinters
Sportspeople from Buenos Aires Province
21st-century Argentine people